The Expeditionary Combat Aviation Brigade, 34th Infantry Division (ECAB) is a unit of the Minnesota Army National Guard that supports the 34th Infantry Division and the state of Minnesota by providing aviation capabilities. The brigade is based in Saint Paul and uses UH-60 Black Hawk and CH-47 Chinook helicopters, and Beechcraft C-12 Huron fixed-wing aircraft for federal and state missions.

The Minnesota-based subordinate units of the ECAB are

2nd Battalion (Assault Helicopter), 147th Aviation Regiment
Company C, 1st Battalion (General Support), 171st Aviation Regiment
Companies B and C, 2nd Battalion (General Support), 211th Aviation Regiment
Company F, 1st Battalion (General Support), 189th Aviation Regiment
834th Aviation Support Battalion (834th ASB)
Outside Minnesota, the ECAB provides training and operational guidance to the 1st Battalion, 112th Aviation Regiment of the ND ARNG, the 1st Battalion, 189th Aviation Regiment of the Montana and Missouri Army National Guard and the 1st Battalion, 183d Aviation Regiment of the Idaho Army National Guard.

Structure

While under state control, the brigade consists of the following aviation elements:

  Company A, 2nd Battalion (Assault Helicopter), 147th Aviation Regiment
  Company B, 2nd Battalion (General Support), 211th Aviation Regiment
  Company C, 2nd Battalion (General Support), 211th Aviation Regiment
  Company F, 1st Battalion (General Support), 189th Aviation Regiment
 Company C, 3rd Battalion (General Support), 238th Aviation Regiment (HH-60)
 Company C, 1st Battalion (General Support), 171st Aviation Regiment
  834th Aviation Support Battalion (834th ASB)

The brigade also provides training and operational guidance for the following units:

  1st Battalion (Surveillance and Security), 112th Aviation Regiment (ND ARNG)
  1st Battalion (Attack Helicopter), 183rd Aviation Regiment (ID ARNG)
  1st Battalion (General Support), 189th Aviation Regiment (MT ARNG and MO ARNG)

History

2008-2009 More than 700 Combat Aviation Brigade, 34th Infantry Division soldiers deployed to Iraq and Afghanistan.
2010 The Saint Cloud-based Company B, 2d Battalion (General Support), 211th Aviation Regiment, departed in November for an Iraq War Operation New Dawn deployment. Flying CH-47 Chinook cargo helicopters, Company B provided aerial movement of troops, equipment and supplies for support of maneuver, combat and combat service support operations.
2013 In May, the Combat Aviation Brigade provided CH-47 and UH-60 helicopters and personnel to local government agencies to fight and contain three wildfires in northwest Minnesota. In 2013, the Combat Aviation Brigade welcomed home the St. Cloud-based Company C, 2d Battalion (General Support), 211th Aviation Regiment from a deployment in support of Operation Enduring Freedom where they conducted more than 650 medical evacuation missions and flew 1,700 accident-free flight hours. The company also received six new CH-47F Chinook helicopters and trained more than 30 personnel in their operation. 
In June, the ECAB participated in a full-spectrum Warfighter Exercise with the 40th Infantry Division at Fort Leavenworth. During this exercise, the brigade staff was able to successfully integrate with different levels of command and adjacent units.
October 2019-October 2020 34th ECAB deployed with nearly 700 Soldiers from Minnesota to command an aviation task force of over 1,400 Soldiers from the active component, Army Reserves, Army National Guard from ten different states, and coalition partners from Spain and Italy to the Middle East.

References

External links
 Global Security.Org entry on the Combat Aviation Brigade, 34th Infantry Division

CAB034
Military units and formations in Minnesota
Aviation Brigades of the United States Army